Sscaddcvarun Kheyl (also Romanized as Sārūn Kheyl; also known as Sarūn Kheyr) is a village in Gatab-e Shomali Rural District, Gatab District, Babol County, Mazandaran Province, Iran. At the 2006 census, its population was 72, in 19 families.

References 

Populated places in Babol County